Oliva emeliodina is a species of sea snail, a marine gastropod mollusk in the family Olividae, the olives.

Description

Distribution
This marine species occurs off Vietnam.

References

 Chenu, 1845 - Parts 35. In Illustrations Conchyliologiques ou description et figures de toutes les coquilles connues vivantes et fossiles, classées suivant le système de Lamarck modifié d'après les progrès de la science et comprenant les genres nouveaux et les espèces récemment découvertes, p. Oliva pp 29-31 ; Strombus pp 17, pl 7, 6, 21, 15 ; Serpula pl 5, 6
 Kilburn, R.N. (1980). The genus Oliva (Mollusca: Gastropoda: Olividae) in southern Africa and Mozambique. Annals of the Natal Museum. 24(1): 221–231.
 Steyn, D.G & Lussi, M. (2005). Offshore Shells of Southern Africa: A pictorial guide to more than 750 Gastropods. Published by the authors. Pp. i–vi, 1–289
 Vervaet F.L.J. (2018). The living Olividae species as described by Pierre-Louis Duclos. Vita Malacologica. 17: 1-111

emeliodina
Gastropods described in 1845